Valentine Barker was a boxer from England, who competed in the Heavyweight division during his career as an amateur.

Amateur career
Barker was a British amateur boxer who won the Amateur Boxing Association of England, 1891 heavyweight title, boxing out of the Belsize ABC.

Life after boxing
Barker would later become involved in amateur boxing in Great Britain, and was the first Honorary Secretary of the Federation Internationale de Boxe Amateur in 1920.  He was president of the ABA from 1926 to 1929. In 1936, the Val Barker Trophy was dedicated in his honour, and is presented to the outstanding boxer at the Olympic Games. He died in 1941.

References

1855 deaths
1941 deaths
English male boxers
Heavyweight boxers
England Boxing champions